Briar Hill is a district of Northampton, England, United Kingdom.

References 

Northampton